Te Wiata is a Māori surname that may refer to the following notable people:
Beryl Te Wiata (1925–2017), New Zealand actor, author and scriptwriter
Inia Te Wiata (1915–1971), New Zealand Māori bass-baritone opera singer, film actor and artist
Rima Te Wiata (born 1963), British-born New Zealand singer, comedian and stage, film and television actress

Māori-language surnames